The Hunt River greenstone belt, also called the Hunt River volcanic belt, is a northeast trending Mesoarchean greenstone belt in Newfoundland and Labrador, Canada, located along the coast of Labrador about  west of the town of Hopedale.

See also
List of greenstone belts

References

Greenstone belts
Labrador
Volcanism of Newfoundland and Labrador
Mesoarchean volcanism